United Nations Security Council resolution 1544, adopted on 19 May 2004, after recalling resolutions 242 (1967), 338 (1973), 446 (1979), 1322 (2000), 1397 (2002), 1402 (2002), 1403 (2002), 1405 (2002), 1435 (2002) and 1515 (2003), the Council called on Israel to cease demolishing Palestinian homes.

The United States abstained from the vote on Resolution 1544, saying it had urged Israel to exercise restraint and that the issue of Palestinian militants smuggling weapons through Gaza was not addressed.

Resolution

Observations
The Security Council reiterated that Israel, as the occupying power, to abide by its legal obligations under the Fourth Geneva Convention, while it was called upon to address its security needs according to international law. It expressed its concern at the deterioration of the situation in the Israeli-occupied territories since 1967 and condemnation of the killing of a Palestinian in the Rafah area.

The preamble of the resolution also expressed concern at the demolition of Palestinian homes in the Rafah camp. The Council recalled the obligations of the Israeli government and the Palestinian Authority under the road map for peace. All acts of terror, violence and destruction were condemned.

Acts
The Council called on Israel to respect its obligations under international humanitarian law and end the demolition of homes in violation of that law. There was concern at the humanitarian situation of Palestinians made homeless in the Rafah area and emergency assistance was required. Both parties were called upon to end violence, respect legal obligations and immediately implement their obligations under the road map.

See also
 Arab–Israeli conflict
 Israeli–Palestinian conflict
 List of United Nations Security Council Resolutions 1501 to 1600 (2003–2005)
 Second Intifada
 Violence in the Israeli–Palestinian conflict 2004

References

External links
 
Text of the Resolution at undocs.org

 1544
 1544
Israeli–Palestinian conflict and the United Nations
2004 in Israel
May 2004 events